The Brunei national cricket team was the team that represented the country of Brunei in international cricket. It was organised by the Brunei Darussalam National Cricket Association, which became an affiliate member of the International Cricket Council in 1992. However, the association was expelled in 2015 (having been suspended in 2014), meaning the team's current status is unclear. Brunei played its first recorded match in 1983, but did not appear in an international game until the 1996 ACC Trophy. The side did not appear in another Asian Cricket Council (ACC) tournament until 2004, but made regular appearances throughout the remainder of the decade. Brunei's last major tournament to date was the 2010 ACC Trophy Challenge in Thailand.

Tournament history

ACC Trophy
1996: Group stages
2006: Group stages
2009 Challenge: 6th place
2010 Challenge: 7th place

Overall record

One-day 
Below is a record of international matches played in the one-day format by Brunei between 1996 and 2010.

References

Cricket in Brunei
National cricket teams
Cricket
Brunei in international cricket